Bangladesh Atomic Energy Commission is a scientific research organization and regulatory body of Bangladesh. Its main objective is to promote use of atomic energy for peaceful purposes. It was established on 27 February 1973, after the independence of Bangladesh, the Pakistan Atomic Energy Commission no longer having jurisdiction.

Headquarters
At first BAEC started its activities at a building for Jute Research Institute.  Afterwards it was transferred to Dhaka University campus at 4 Kazi Nazrul Islam Avenue.  Before 1988 it was spelled 'Bangladesh Anobik Shakti Kamishon' (Literary Meaning: Bangladesh Molecular Energy Commission) in Bangla, from then it was renamed 'Bangladesh Paramanu Shakti Kamishon' (Bangladesh Atomic Energy Commission (BAEC)).  In 2006, the headquarter (HQ) of BAEC was shifted to the newly built 'Poromanu Bhaban' building at Agargaon, Shere Bangla Nagar, Dhaka which is next to the science museum in Bangladesh.  All the research and development activities of BAEC are conducted under three branches: physical sciences, biological sciences and engineering.

Research organisations
 Atomic Energy Centre, Dhaka,
 Atomic Energy Research Establishment (AERE), Savar
 Institute of Nuclear Science and Technology (INST)
 Institute of Food and Radiation Biology (IFRB)
 Institute of Electronics (IE)
 Institute of Computer Science (ICS)
 Reactor Operation and Maintenance Unit (ROMU)
 Tissue Banking and Biomaterial Research Unit (TBBRU)
 Nuclear Minerals Unit (NMU)
 Central Engineering Facilities (CEF)
 Energy Institute (EI)
 Institute of Radiation and Polymer Technology (IRPT)
 Training Institute (TI)
 Scientific Information Unit (SIU)
 Nuclear Safety and Radiation Control Division (NS&RCD)
 Radiation Testing and Monitoring Laboratory (RTML), Chittagong
 Beach Sand Minerals Exploitation Centre (BSMEC), Cox's Bazar
 Nuclear Power and Energy Division (NPED)
 Institute of Nuclear Medicine and Ultrasound
 INMAS, BSMMU Campus, Shahbag, Dhaka
 INMAS, Dhaka Medical College Campus, Dhaka
 INMAS, S.S. Medical College Campus, Mitford
 INMAS, Chittagong Medical College Campus
 INMAS, Mymensingh Medical College Campus
 INMAS, Sylhet Medical College Campus
 INMAS, Rajshahi Medical College Campus
 INMAS, Dinajpur Medical College Campus
 INMAS, Rangpur Medical College Campus
 INMAS, Khulna Medical College Campus
 INMAS, Barisal Medical College Campus
 INMAS, Faridpur Medical College Campus
 INMAS, Bogra Medical College Campus
 INMAS, Comilla Medical College Campus
 INMAS, Kalatoli, Cox's Bazar

MOU with Rosatom
BAEC signed a memorandum of understanding (MoU) with Rosatom in 2009 to enhance cooperation between the two countries in the peaceful use of nuclear energy. The MoU lays the groundwork for negotiations to set up the 600-1000 MW Ruppur Nuclear Power Plant in Bangladesh.

Gallery

References

External links

 Official Page
 MOSICT Page
 Page at Regional Co-operative Agreement website

Nuclear regulatory organizations
Science and technology in Bangladesh
Bangladeshi research organisations
Energy in Bangladesh
1973 establishments in Bangladesh
Research institutes in Bangladesh